The abbreviation WMRL or W.M.R.L. may refer to:

WMRL (FM), a satellite station of the American radio station WMRA
West Midlands (Regional) League, an English soccer competition